Tarm is a small railway town with a population of 4,010 (1 January 2022) in west Denmark, 36 kilometres southwest of Herning (air distance). The road distance between Herning and Tarm is exactly 47,8 kilometres (Herning-Videbæk-Skjern-Tarm route). It is located in the Ringkøbing-Skjern Municipality.

Notable people 
 Agner Krarup Erlang (1878 at Lønborg, near Tarm – 1929) a Danish mathematician, statistician and engineer
 Asger Christensen (born 1958 in Tarm) a Danish politician, farmer and MEP
 Trine Troelsen (born 1985 in Tarm) a Danish team handball player, playing for FC Midtjylland Håndbold and for the Denmark women's national handball team
 Kennie Chopart (born 1990 in Tarm) a Danish footballer who plays for Icelandic side Reykjavik

References

External links
 The Tourist Information Site for Tarm

Cities and towns in the Central Denmark Region
Ringkøbing-Skjern Municipality